Hilderic Friend was an English Wesleyan minister and naturalist. He is widely known for his book Flowers and Flower Lore.

Biography 
Hilderic Friend was born 6 November 1852 at High Wigsell (East Sussex).
He spent his early years in the vicinity of Hastings. In 1874 he entered the College at Richmond. Two years later he sailed as a missionary to China. Because of his health he returned home in 1880.

With the view to recuperation he served in circuits in rural places. The first was Newton Abbott in Devonshire. Here he could spend much time in the open air. He started practising field botany. In 1882 he wrote A Glossary of Devonshire Plant Names. One year later his Flowers and Flower Lore was published.

In later years Friend travelled all over the country. Around 1895, for instance, he was allotted the Cockermouth circuit for three years.

He retired in 1914.

Friend died 7 February 1940.

Worms 
Hilderic Friend became interested in worms, and especially since his retirement he devoted much time to the study of the Annelids. He discovered many new species.

Bibliography 
Some of the written publications of Hilderic Friend are:

Journal publications 
Hilderic Friend published a large number of articles in journals. Among his publications are:

References 
 Notes

 Sources
  
 

British nature writers
Wesleyan ministers
1852 births
1940 deaths